Beta is an extinct town in Fulton County, in the U.S. state of Ohio. It was located in York Township.

History
Beta was formerly located in Henry County until land was given to create Fulton County in 1850. A post office called Beta was established in 1857, and remained in operation until 1901.

References

Geography of Fulton County, Ohio
Ghost towns in Ohio
1857 establishments in Ohio
Populated places established in 1857